KYC may refer to:
 Know your customer, guidelines in financial services
 Kyaka language of Papua New Guinea (ISO code: kyc)

Yacht clubs
 Kaiserlicher Yacht Club, Kiel, Germany 
 Kamini Yacht Club, Hydra, Greece
 Kenosha Yacht Club, Wisconsin, United States 
 Kieler Yacht-Club, Kiel, Germany
 Kingston Yacht Club, Ontario, Canada 
 Knysna Yacht Club, Western Cape, South Africa